KPAC may refer to:

 Kerala People's Arts Club, a theatrical arts club in Kerala, India
 Krider Performing Arts Center, an auditorium in Paris, Tennessee, United States
 KPAC (FM), a radio station (88.3 FM) licensed to San Antonio, Texas, United States
 K-PAC (University of the Pacific), a radio station on the campus of the University of the Pacific in Stockton, California, United States
 KBTV-TV, a television station (channel 4) licensed to Port Arthur, Texas, United States, which formerly used the call sign KPAC
 Kochavva Paulo Ayyappa Coelho, a 2016 Malayalam film